This is a list of schools in the Metropolitan Borough of Sefton in the English county of Merseyside.

State-funded schools

Primary schools

Ainsdale St John's CE Primary School, Ainsdale
Aintree Davenhill Primary School, Aintree
All Saints RC Primary School, Bootle
Bedford Primary School, Bootle
Birkdale Primary School, Birkdale
Bishop David Sheppard CE Primary School, Southport
Christ Church CE Primary School, Bootle
Churchtown Primary School, Churchtown
English Martyrs RC Primary School, Litherland
Farnborough Road Infant School, Birkdale
Farnborough Road Junior School, Birkdale
Forefield Community Infant and Nursery School, Crosby
Forefield Junior School, Crosby
Freshfield Primary School, Formby
The Grange Primary School, Bootle
Great Crosby RC Primary School, Crosby
Green Park Primary School, Maghull
Hatton Hill Primary School, Litherland
Holy Family RC Primary School, Southport
Holy Rosary RC Primary School, Aintree
Holy Spirit RC Academy, Bootle
Holy Trinity CE Primary School, Southport
Hudson Primary School, Maghull
Kew Woods Primary School, Southport
Kings Meadow Primary School, Ainsdale
Lander Road Primary School, Litherland
Larkfield Primary School, Southport
Linacre Primary School, Bootle
Linaker Primary School, Southport
Litherland Moss Primary School, Litherland
Lydiate Primary School, Lydiate
Marshside Primary School, Marshside
Melling Primary School, Melling
Netherton Moss Primary School, Netherton
Northway Primary School, Maghull
Norwood Primary School, Southport
Our Lady of Compassion RC Primary School, Formby
Our Lady of Lourdes RC Primary School, Southport
Our Lady of Walsingham RC Primary School, Netherton
Our Lady Queen of Peace RC Primary School, Litherland
Our Lady Star of the Sea RC Primary School, Seaforth
Redgate Community Primary School, Formby
Rimrose Hope CE Primary School, Seaforth
St Andrew's CE Primary School, Maghull
St Benedict's RC Primary School, Netherton
St Edmund's and St Thomas' RC Primary School, Waterloo
St Elizabeth's RC Primary School, Litherland
St George's RC Primary School, Maghull
St Gregory's RC Primary School, Lydiate
St Jerome's RC Primary School, Formby
St John Bosco RC Primary School, Maghull
St John's CE Primary School, Crossens
St John's CE Primary School, Waterloo
St Luke's CE Primary School, Crosby
St Luke's CE Primary School, Formby
St Mary's RC Primary School, Crosby
St Monica's RC Primary School, Bootle
St Nicholas' CE Primary School, Blundellsands
St Oswald's CE Primary School, Netherton
St Patrick's RC Primary School, Churchtown
St Philip's CE Primary School, Litherland
St Philip's CE Primary School, Southport
St Robert Bellarmine RC Primary School, Bootle
St Thomas's CE Primary School, Lydiate
St William of York RC Primary School, Crosby
Shoreside Primary School, Ainsdale
Springwell Park Community Primary School, Bootle
Summerhill Primary School, Maghull
Thomas Gray Primary School, Bootle
Trinity St Peter's CE Primary School, Formby
Ursuline RC Primary School, Blundellsands
Valewood Primary School, Crosby
Waterloo Primary School, Waterloo
Woodlands Primary School, Formby

Secondary schools

Birkdale High School, Birkdale
Chesterfield High School, Crosby
Christ the King Catholic High School, Southport
Deyes High School, Maghull
Formby High School, Formby
Greenbank High School, Southport
Hillside High School, Bootle
Holy Family Catholic High School, Thornton
King's Leadership Academy Hawthornes,  Bootle
Litherland High School, Litherland
Maghull High School, Maghull
Maricourt Catholic School, Maghull
Meols Cop High School, Southport
Range High School, Formby
Sacred Heart Catholic College, Crosby
St Michael's Church of England High School, Crosby
The Salesian Academy of St John Bosco, Bootle
Stanley High School, Southport

Special and alternative schools
Crosby High School, Crosby
IMPACT, Bootle
Jigsaw Primary Pupil Referral Unit, Thornton
Merefield School, Southport
Newfield School, Crosby
Presfield High School, Churchtown
Rowan Park School, Litherland

Further education
Hugh Baird College
King George V College
South Sefton College
Southport College

Independent schools

Senior and all-through schools
Merchant Taylors' Boys' School, Crosby, Crosby
Merchant Taylors' Girls' School, Crosby
St Mary's College, Crosby

Special and alternative schools
Educ8 Liverpool, Seaforth
Olsen House School, Crosby
Peterhouse School, Churchtown
Turning Point Academy, Bootle

Sefton
 List of schools in Sefton